Ruth Pearl (born Eveline Rejwan; November 11, 1935 – July 20, 2021) was an Israeli-American software developer. She was the mother ofWall Street Journal journalist Daniel Pearl, who was murdered by Muslim extremists connected to Al-Qaeda in 2002.

Early life
Pearl was born Eveline Rejwan on November 11, 1935, in Baghdad, Iraq. Her father, Joseph, was a tailor who ran an import business, and her mother, Victoria (Abada) Rejwan, was a homemaker. She had four siblings: two older brothers and two younger sisters. When Pearl was 5, she lived through the Farhud, an outbreak of anti-Jewish violence in Iraq following a failed nationalist coup. She and her family hid in their home for days, protected by their Arab neighbors who told rioters that no Jews lived there.

Her family then moved to a suburb of Baghdad but anti-Jewish attacks persisted and she herself witnessed the bodies of Iraqi Jews hanging from gallows in a square. Her father lost vision in one eye after an assault and he had to bribe a police officer to free his two sons after they were arrested on false charges.

In the late 1940s, Pearl worked with an underground Zionist movement that facilitated the emigration of Jews, then illegal, to British-controlled Mandatory Palestine. At this time, Pearl began using the Hebrew name Ruth. Around 1948, her two older brothers were smuggled into Palestine from Iraq. In 1949, Ruth's oldest brother was killed fighting for the Israeli army, which she did not learn about until years later as her father had withheld the information from his family. In 1951, Pearl arrived with her family in Israel as part of the mass exodus of Iraqi Jews.

Education
Pearl entered the Israeli Navy in 1955. Recognizing her skill in mathematics, the Navy
assigned her to teach trigonometry to officer candidates. She went on to study at the Technion – Israel Institute of Technology, where she earned a degree in electrical engineering as one of
four women in a class of 120.

While at Technion, she met Judea Pearl and, in 1960, they married and moved to the United States for graduate studies. She earned a master’s degree in electrical engineering from the Newark College of Engineering (now known as the New Jersey Institute of Technology).

Professional life
Before finishing her master’s, Pearl started working on microwave antennas while her husband pursued his graduate studies at the Polytechnic Institute of Brooklyn (now NYU School of Engineering). The couple had two children and continued to live in New Jersey until 1966, when they moved to Los Angeles. They had a third child in Los Angeles in 1969.

From the mid-1960s to the mid-1990s, Pearl worked as a computer software developer and systems analyst. Her talent for trouble-shooting mainframes and other computer systems of that era led to a long career at TRW and NCR Corp. She later consulted to major banks in the LA area and earned a reputation as a wizard troubleshooter.

After the kidnapping and murder of her son Daniel in 2002, Pearl and her family started the nonprofit Daniel Pearl Foundation to continue Daniel’s legacy and values. The organization seeks to promote tolerance, combat hatred, and nurture cross-cultural understanding, particularly through journalism, music and dialogue, three of Daniel’s passions in life.

Pearl served in multiple executive roles with the Daniel Pearl Foundation, effectively managing it as CEO. She helped establish and guide numerous programs, including Daniel Pearl Journalism Fellowships, which bring mid-career journalists from Muslim-dominated countries to work at U.S.-based news organizations. She also oversaw Daniel Pearl World Music Days, an annual celebration of global concerts dedicated to using music as a bridge between cultures. Through these programs and others, she hoped to combat hatred and violence by connecting people through their common humanity.

Pearl and her husband also edited the book I Am Jewish: Personal Reflections Inspired by the Last Words of Daniel Pearl, winner of the 2004 National Jewish Book Award. Taking its name from Daniel’s final words before his murder, the book presents essays and observations from prominent Jewish figures on Jewish identity and what those words mean to them, and thus provides a panoramic view of how Jews define themselves in the 21st century.

References

1935 births
2021 deaths
Iraqi Jews
People from Baghdad
People from Los Angeles
Israeli Jews
Israeli emigrants to the United States
Iraqi emigrants to Israel
Technion – Israel Institute of Technology alumni
Israeli Navy personnel
New Jersey Institute of Technology alumni
New York University alumni